Center Township is one of twenty-one townships in LaPorte County, Indiana. As of the 2010 census, its population was 25,075 and it contained 10,994 housing units.

History
Center Township (also historically spelled Centre) was established in 1833. It was named from its position near the geographical center of LaPorte County.

Geography

References

External links
 Indiana Township Association
 United Township Association of Indiana

Townships in LaPorte County, Indiana
Townships in Indiana